Nova, stylised as NOVA, is an Icelandic telecommunications company that began operations on December 1, 2007. Nova owns and operates its own 3G/4G/5G mobile network and offers FTTH fibre internet services through bit-stream access. 

Nova ehf. was established in May 2006. At the end of March 2007, Nova received a 3G operating license and then officially opened on December 1, 2007. On April 4, 2013, Nova launched 4G/LTE service, the first for an Icelandic telephone company. On the 5th of May 2020 (05.05.2020), Nova launched its 5G network, again a first for Iceland. Nova's initial growth is attributed to its offer of free calls and SMS between its own subscribers, popular with younger consumers. Nova is the 2nd largest mobile phone company in Iceland with 32.9% market share in 2020 according to Electronic Communications Office of Iceland.  

Nova was awarded the 'Marketing Company of the Year' in 2009 and 2014.

Distribution
Nova operates its own 3G, 4G and 5G mobile and network networks, which covers about 95% of the population. But Vodafone and Nova also have a contract for sharing each other's mobile networks. The agreement means that Vodafone will have access to Nova's new third-generation mobile network (3G) and Nova will have access to Vodafone's GSM mobile network. By the end of 2011, users had reached 100,000, reaching 156,000 in 2020.

See also
Síminn
Vodafone
Telecommunications in Iceland
Internet in Iceland

References

External links

Telecommunications companies of Iceland
Internet service providers of Iceland
Companies based in Reykjavík
Telecommunications companies established in 2007